Bae Lee-sak (Hangul: 배이삭, born May 29, 1983), better known by his stage name Kebee (Hangul: 키비), is a South Korean rapper and member of Eluphant. He released his first album, Evolutional Poems, on October 19, 2004.

Discography

Studio albums

Charted singles

References

1983 births
Living people
South Korean male rappers
South Korean hip hop singers
21st-century South Korean  male singers
Brand New Music artists